Kevin Brown (born July 9, 1970) is an American poet, author and teacher.  He has published three full collections of poems--Liturgical Calendar: Poems; A Lexicon of Lost Words; and Exit Lines, as well as a memoir, Another Way: Finding Faith, Then Finding It Again.  He has also published essays in The Chronicle of Higher Education, Academe, InsideHigherEd, The Teaching Professor, and Eclectica Magazine. He has published a work of scholarship--They Love to Tell the Story: Five Contemporary Novelists Take on the Gospels—as well as critical articles on Kurt Vonnegut, John Barth, Ralph Ellison, Tony Earley, and what English majors do after graduation.

Early life 
Kevin Brown was born in Jackson, Tennessee.  He grew up in Johnson City, Tennessee, with his parents and two siblings.  Both of his parents worked at East Tennessee State University (ETSU).  His father, Jim Brown, attended ETSU as a student and was inducted into the ETSU Athletic Hall of Fame in 2002.  As a teenager, Kevin played sports as well as competed in Bible Bowl competitions.

Education 
Kevin received his Bachelor of Arts degree in English at Milligan College in Elizabethton, Tennessee.  He went on to pursue a Master's degree in English from East Tennessee State University and graduated in 1994.  He finished his Ph.D in English in December 1996, graduating from the University of Mississippi.  He returned to school for a Master's in Library and Information Science, graduating in 1999 from the University of Alabama.  He received his Master's of Fine Arts in Creative Writing from Murray State University in 2012.

Work experience 
His first jobs were in private high schools, as Kevin began teaching English in 1997 at the Culver Academies, where he also worked as an assistant coach for the girls basketball team.  After attending the University of Alabama, he was hired at Stratford Academy, where he taught for one year before serving as librarian for one year.  In 2001, he was hired at Lee University as an Assistant Professor of English.  He worked for Lee for two years, then moved to Tacoma, Washington to take a position as Upper School Librarian.  He worked there one year before returning to Lee, where he has been since.  He is currently a Professor of English there, teaching both literature and creative writing courses.  He is the only professor to receive all three faculty awards (teaching, advising, and scholarship).

Bibliography 
Full-Length Poetry Collections

Exit Lines: Poems (2009, Plain View Press)

A Lexicon of Lost Words (2014, Snake Nation Press)

Liturgical Calendar: Poems (2014, Wipf and Stock Publishers)

Chapbooks

Abecedarium (2011, Finishing Line Press)

Holy Days (2012, Split Oak Press)

Memoir

Another Way: Finding Faith, Then Finding Faith Again (2012, Wipf and Stock Publishers)

Literary Criticism

They Love to Tell the Story: Five Contemporary Novelists Take on the Gospels (2012, Kennesaw State University Press)

Awards and honors 
 Lee University Excellence in Teaching award, 2011-12
 Lee University Excellence in Scholarship Recipient, 2009-10
 Lee University Excellence in Advising award, 2010-11
 Sigma Tau Delta Outstanding Regional Sponsor Award, Southern Region, 2010-11
 First Place in Violet Reed Haas Prize for Poetry, Snake Nation Press, 2012; A Lexicon of Lost Words
 Honorable Mention and Finalist in Quercus Review Spring Poetry Book Award Contest, 2014; Jack Imagines a Different Map
 First Place in Split Oak Press Chapbook Competition, 2011; Holy Days
 Finalist for Stephen Dunn Prize in Poetry (The Broome Review and Split Oak Press), 2011; Holy Days
 Semi-Finalist in Elixir Antivenom Poetry Award, 2011; A Lexicon of Lost Words
 Finalist in Elixir Press Eleventh Annual Poetry Awards, 2010; A Lexicon of Lost Words
 Finalist in Concrete Wolf Chapbook Award, 2010; Holy Days
 Finalist in Copperdome Poetry Chapbook Competition, 2010; Holy Days
 Finalist in Plan B Press Poetry Chapbook Competition, 2010; Holy Days
 Honorable Mention and Two Finalists for Joy Bale Boone Poetry Prize, The Heartland Review, 2010
 Two Honorable Mentions for Ruth Redel Poetry Contest, The Heartland Review, 2010
 Second Runner-Up in Concrete Wolf Chapbook Award, 2009; Abecedarium

References

External links 
 Author website
 "Diagramming Won't Help This Situation" on The Writer's Almanac
 Interview at Poets' Quarterly
 Review of Exit Lines
 Review of Abecedarium
 Review of Abecedarium
 "Why I Don't Write" by Kevin Brown
 Poets & Writers Directory Listing
 Linkedin Directory Listing

1970 births
English-language poets
American male poets
American essayists
People from Jackson, Tennessee
Poets from Tennessee
Lee University faculty
Milligan University alumni
East Tennessee State University alumni
University of Mississippi alumni
University of Alabama alumni
Murray State University alumni
Living people
American male essayists
21st-century American poets
21st-century American male writers